Peter Myers is an Australian former professional basketball player who played in the National Basketball League (NBL) for the Geelong Supercats in 1984 and 1985. In 37 games for Geelong over his two seasons, Myers averaged 1.4 points per game. He was listed at 6'5".

Myers later moved to Geraldton in Western Australia, where he coached both of his sons, Jordan and Dylan.

References

Living people
Australian men's basketball players
Geelong Supercats players
Year of birth missing (living people)